Index Peak is a peak over  high, standing  southeast of Cape Garcia on the west coast of Graham Land, Antarctica. It was mapped by the Falkland Islands Dependencies Survey from photos taken by Hunting Aerosurveys Ltd in 1956–57, and so named by the UK Antarctic Place-Names Committee because the peak resembles an index finger.

References

Mountains of Graham Land
Graham Coast